Piletocera inconspicua is a moth in the family Crambidae. It was described by Schaus in 1912. It is found in Costa Rica.

References

I
Endemic fauna of Costa Rica
Moths of Central America
Moths described in 1912